Phil McColeman (born March 15, 1954) is a former Canadian politician who served as a Member of Parliament (MP) from 2008 to 2021 as a member of the Conservative Party. He represented the riding of Brant from 2008 to 2015 and, following the 2012 federal electoral district redistribution, he represented the riding of Brantford—Brant from 2015 to 2021. On 8 January 2021, he announced that he would not seek re-election in the 2021 federal election.

Prior to entering politics, McColeman ran a construction business for 24 years. He is also a former president of the Brantford Homebuilders’ Association.

Electoral record

References

External links
Phil McColeman

1954 births
Conservative Party of Canada MPs
Members of the House of Commons of Canada from Ontario
Living people
Kent State Golden Flashes men's ice hockey players
Kent State University alumni
Politicians from Brantford
Wilfrid Laurier University alumni
21st-century Canadian politicians